Governor Woodbury may refer to:

Levi Woodbury, 9th Governor of New Hampshire
Urban A. Woodbury, 45th Governor of Vermont